Sander Gillé and Joran Vliegen were the defending champions but chose not to defend their title.

Fabrício Neis and David Vega Hernández won the title after defeating Hsieh Cheng-peng and Rameez Junaid 7–6(7–4), 6–1 in the final.

Seeds

Draw

References
 Main Draw

Internationaux de Tennis de Blois - Doubles
2018 Doubles